The IPSC Australasia Handgun Championship is an IPSC level 4 championship hosted every third year in Australasia.

History 
 1996 Cebu, Philippines
 1998 Melbourne, Australia
 2001 Cebu, Philippines
 2004 Bali, Indonesia
 2007 Pattaya, Thailand
 2010 Johor Bahru, Malaysia
 2013 Rotorua, New Zealand
 2016 Surabaya, Indonesia
 2019 Philippines

Champions 
The following is a list of current and past IPSC Australasian Handgun Champions.

Overall category

Lady category

Junior category

Senior category

Super Senior category

References

 Match Results - 2004 IPSC Australasia Handgun Championship, Indonesia
 Match Results - 2007 IPSC Australasia Handgun Championship, Thailand
 Match Results - 2010 IPSC Australasia Handgun Championship, Malaysia
 Match Results - 2013 IPSC Australasia Handgun Championship, New Zealand
 Match Results - 2016 IPSC Australasia Handgun Championship, Indonesia
 WinMSS - 2016 Australasia Handgun Championship

IPSC shooting competitions
Oceanian international sports competitions
Shooting sports in Asia
Shooting sports in Oceania